Ivan Kovačić (born 25 April 1974) is a Croatian Politician. Since May 2020, Kovačić is the president of the newly formed Party with a First and Last Name (SSIP).

See also 
 Cabinet of Andrej Plenković

References

Government ministers of Croatia
1974 births
Representatives in the modern Croatian Parliament
Living people